Vikna is a large island archipelago and a former municipality in Trøndelag county, Norway. The municipality existed from 1869 until its dissolution in 2020 when it joined Nærøysund Municipality. It was part of the Namdalen region.  The administrative centre of the municipality was the town of Rørvik.  Other villages in Vikna included Austafjord, Garstad, and Valøya.

At the time of its dissolution in 2020, the  municipality was the 269th largest by area out of the 422 municipalities in Norway. Vikna was the 221st most populous municipality in Norway with a population of 4,492.

General information

The municipality of Vikten was established on 1 July 1869 when it was separated from the large municipality of Nærøy.  Initially, the population of Vikten was 1,749.  On 1 January 1881, a small area of Fosnes (population: 61) was transferred to Vikten.  The name of the municipality was later changed to Vikna.

On 1 January 2018, the municipality switched from the old Nord-Trøndelag county to the new Trøndelag county.

On 1 January 2020, the municipality of Vikna was merged with most of the neighboring municipality of Nærøy to form the new Nærøysund Municipality. The Lund area in Nærøy was not part of the merger. It became part of the newly enlarged Namsos Municipality on the same date.

Name
The municipality (originally the parish) is named "Vikna" or historically Vikten. It was named after the three large islands which made up the municipality: Inner-Vikna, Mellom-Vikna, and Ytter-Vikna. The name is derived from the word  which means "cove" or "wick" (likely since the islands have numerous coves and inlets.

Coat of arms
The coat of arms was granted on 13 May 1988 and it was in use until 1 January 2020 when the municipality was dissolved. The official blazon is "Azure, three salmon argent in annulo". This means the arms have a blue field (background) and the charge is three salmon forming a circle. The fish design has a tincture of argent which means it is commonly colored white, but if it is made out of metal, then silver is used. This design was chosen to symbolize the importance of salmon fishing and farming in the municipality. The arms were designed by Torleif Flosand. The municipal flag has the same design as the coat of arms.

Churches
The Church of Norway had one parish within the municipality of Vikna. It was part of the Namdal prosti (deanery) in the Diocese of Nidaros.

Geography

The municipality consisted of a large island archipelago with some 6,000 large and small islands going far into the Norwegian Sea off the northwestern coast of Trøndelag county. Vikna is the largest spawning area for cod south of Lofoten. The three largest islands are: Inner-Vikna, closest to the mainland, Mellom-Vikna, and then Ytter-Vikna as the westernmost island.  Other islands include Borgan and Lauvøya.

The main village for the municipality was Rørvik, located on the eastern shore of Inner-Vikna, facing the mainland across the Nærøysundet strait. The many islands in the area means that there are many lighthouses including Gjeslingene Lighthouse, Grinna Lighthouse, Nærøysund Lighthouse, and Nordøyan Lighthouse.

On 21 October 1962, the coastal steamer (Hurtigruten) Sanct Svithun run aground on Nordøyan as a result of navigational error. The ship sunk, and there was a tragic loss of 41 lives. A memorial bauta was raised on Nordøyan in 2002.

Government
While it existed, this municipality was responsible for primary education (through 10th grade), outpatient health services, senior citizen services, unemployment and other social services, zoning, economic development, and municipal roads. During its existence, this municipality was governed by a municipal council of elected representatives, which in turn elected a mayor. The municipality fell under the Namdal District Court and the Frostating Court of Appeal.

Municipal council
The municipal council of Vikna is made up of 23 representatives that are elected to four year terms.  The party breakdown of the final municipal council was as follows:

Mayors
The mayors of Vikna:

1870–1875: Iver Kirkeby
1876–1877: Arnold Bugge
1878–1881: Benjamin Gjestsen
1882–1898: Kasper Sund (V)
1899–1901: Christoffer Inderberg (V)
1902–1904: Knut Rangsæter (V)
1905–1922: Christoffer Inderberg (V)
1923–1928: Christian Ulsund (Bp)
1929–1942: Ingvar Inderberg (V)
1942–1943: T.B. Norberg (NS)
1943–1945: Fredrik C. Hansen (NS)
1945-1945: Ingvar Inderberg (V)
1946–1947: Arthur Prestvik (Ap)
1948–1951: Leon Brevik (V)
1952–1955: Fredrik Lie-Gjeseth (Bp)
1956–1975: Lars Kirkeby-Garstad (Bp)
1976–1979: Arne Hansen (V)
1980–1983: Roald Kirkeby-Garstad (Sp)
1984–1991: Magnus Kleven (Ap)
1992–1997: Lars Peder Brekk (Sp)
1997–2003: Else Hansvik Storsul (H)
2003–2011: Karin Søraunet (KrF)
2011–2015: Reinert Eidshaug (Ap)
2015–2019: Amund Hellesø (Ap)

Economy
Fishing, fish farming, public services, and agriculture are the main sources of income. The Norveg museum, devoted to the coastal way of life through the centuries, is located in Rørvik.  The Vikna Wind Farm is located on Mellom-Vikna, just west of Garstad, and it produces power for much of the municipality.

Transportation
Hurtigruten boats stop frequently at Rørvik and Norwegian County Road 770 via the Nærøysund Bridge connects Vikna to the mainland and European route E6. There is also the small Rørvik Airport, Ryum, just south of Rørvik. Vikna and neighbouring Nærøy form a common work area with nearly 10,000 inhabitants.

Notable people

See also
List of former municipalities of Norway

References

External links

Norveg Museum
Cultural map of Vikna 
 The plant cover of Kalvøya island

 
Nærøysund
Former municipalities of Norway
Archipelagoes of the Atlantic Ocean
Archipelagoes of Norway
1869 establishments in Norway
2020 disestablishments in Norway
Populated places disestablished in 2020